James J. Ustynoski (May 31, 1932 – November 4, 2000) was a former Republican member of the Pennsylvania House of Representatives.

References

Republican Party members of the Pennsylvania House of Representatives
2000 deaths
1932 births
People from Luzerne County, Pennsylvania
20th-century American politicians
Politicians from Hazleton, Pennsylvania